Pokrovskogo lesouchastka is a rural locality (a settlement) in Nagornoye Rural Settlement, Petushinsky District, Vladimir Oblast, Russia. The population was 105 as of 2010.

Geography 
The settlement is located 23 km southwest of Petushki (the district's administrative centre) by road. Staroye Perepechino is the nearest rural locality.

References 

Rural localities in Petushinsky District